2010 was a year.

2010 may also refer to:
2010s, the decade
2010 FIFA World Cup, the 19th FIFA World Cup, the world championship for men's national association football teams
2010 Winter Olympics, February Winter Olympics that was held in Vancouver, BC
2010: Odyssey Two, a 1982 science fiction novel by Arthur C. Clarke
2010: The Year We Make Contact, a science fiction film released in 1984 directed by Peter Hyams based on the novel
2010 (Stargate SG-1), an episode of Stargate SG-1
2010 Lost Edition, an album by the award-winning reggaeton duo Wisin & Yandel
2010 Biodiversity Target, conservation targets aiming to reduce biodiversity loss by the end of the year 2010
2010 Biodiversity Indicators Partnership, an organization working toward the target
2010 (Li-Ron Choir album), 2011
Twenty Ten (album), a 2010 album by Guy Sebastian